The Centreville Historic District is a historic district in Centreville, Alabama. It includes  and twenty buildings, including the Bibb County Courthouse.  It is roughly bounded by Walnut Street, and the East and West Court squares.  It features examples of Victorian architecture.  The district was added to the National Register of Historic Places on October 19, 1978.

References

External links

 

National Register of Historic Places in Bibb County, Alabama
Historic districts in Bibb County, Alabama
Victorian architecture in Alabama
Historic American Buildings Survey in Alabama
Historic districts on the National Register of Historic Places in Alabama